The Rose Building is a 1902-built historic high-rise office building in Downtown Cleveland's Gateway District in the U.S. state of Ohio that stands 165 feet tall, 10 stories on the corner of Prospect Avenue and East Ninth Street at the very cusp of the city's Nine-Twelve District.  It is named after Cleveland businessman and charity founder Benjamin Rose. It is a designated city of Cleveland landmark. The building is the home of the Cleveland-based health insurance group Medical Mutual of Ohio until 2023.

Structuring
The floors are not the same measurement as we count ten floors today as the rule of thumb for ceiling height was different in the early 1900s. The superstructure literally follows the street grid pattern and appears to vanish into the distance as it runs parallel with its respective street facades. The Rose features wrought iron detailing on its lower floors and heavily decorated panels on the upper floors. When constructed, it was the largest office building in Ohio.

Trivia
It is worth noting that in 1902, the building was considered too far out of the Cleveland central business district and was projected to fail to obtain any tenants. The building is a fine example of turn of the century architecture and continues to guard the much traversed street of Prospect Avenue.

References

Skyscraper office buildings in Cleveland
Office buildings completed in 1902